The Folsom Hotel, at southwest of junction of Grand Ave. and Wall St. in Folsom, New Mexico, is a historic stone building built in 1888 that served as a department store and as a hotel.  It was listed on the U.S. National Register of Historic Places in 1987.

The hotel was originally the Drew & Phillips General Mercantile Store;  it was modified by John Odell in 1910 to serve as a hotel.

In 2009 it appeared long-abandoned.  In another set of photos, undated, it appears to have been converted to a private residence.

See also

National Register of Historic Places listings in Union County, New Mexico

References

Hotel buildings on the National Register of Historic Places in New Mexico
Hotel buildings completed in 1888
Buildings and structures in Union County, New Mexico
National Register of Historic Places in Union County, New Mexico